Marek Godlewski (born 28 April 1965) is a Polish retired footballer.

Career

In 1986, at the age of 21, Godlewski signed for Zagłębie Lubin in the Polish top flight from lower league side Gryf Słupsk.

In 1991, he signed for Galatasaray S.K., Turkey's most successful club, failing to make a league appearance there before returning to Poland with Sokół Pniewy.

After playing for German lower league outfit SV Lurup, he played for Pogoń Lębork, MKS Słupia Słupsk, KS Słupia Kobylnica, and Wybrzeże Objazda in the Polish lower leagues

References

External links
 Marek Godlewski at 90minut
 

Polish footballers
Living people
Association football defenders
1965 births
Gryf Słupsk players
Zagłębie Lubin players
Sokół Pniewy players
Widzew Łódź players
Polish expatriate footballers
Expatriate footballers in Turkey
Polish expatriate sportspeople in Turkey
Expatriate footballers in Germany
Polish expatriate sportspeople in Germany
Poland international footballers
People from Słupsk